Pomaderris virgata, commonly known as upright pomaderris, is a species of flowering plant in the family Rhamnaceae and is endemic to south-eastern continental Australia. It is an erect, slender shrub with hairy branchlets, lance-shaped, narrowly elliptic or oblong leaves, and dense panicles of golden-yellow flowers.

Description
The upper surface of the leaves is glabrous but the lower surface is covered with silky, whitish to yellowish hairs. Flowering occurs in November and December.

Taxonomy
Pomaderris virgata was first formally described in 1988 by Neville Grant Walsh in the journal Muelleria from specimens he collected in 1986 from Nalbaugh National Park (now part of the South East Forests National Park). The specific epithet (virgata) refers to the slender, upright habit of this species.

Distribution and habitat
Upright pomaderris grows in rocky sites, often near watercourses in forest. It is found on the escarpment south from Tuross Falls in Wadbilliga National Park in New South Wales and from a single location near Orbost in north-eastern Victoria.

References

Flora of Victoria (Australia)
Flora of New South Wales
virgata
Plants described in 1988
Taxa named by Neville Grant Walsh